Odostomia umbilicaris is a species of sea snail, a marine gastropod mollusc in the family Pyramidellidae, the pyrams and their allies.

Description
The white shell is thin, transparent, and very glossy.  The length measures . The five to six whorls of the teleoconch have deep sutures. The  umbilicus is very distinct, but small. The columellar tooth is small, but prominent. Owing to the transparency of the whorls, the periphery of each appears like a narrow band round the top of the succeeding one.

Distribution
This species occurs in the following locations:
 European waters (ERMS scope) (Scandinavia, Mediterranean Sea)
 Irish Exclusive economic Zone

References

External links
 To Biodiversity Heritage Library (14 publications)
 To CLEMAM
 To Encyclopedia of Life
 To World Register of Marine Species

umbilicaris
Gastropods described in 1863